Modrany (Hungarian pronunciation:) is a village and municipality in the Komárno District in the Nitra Region of south-west Slovakia.

Geography
The village lies at an altitude of 131 meters and covers an area of 27.066 km2.
It has a population of about 1460 people.
The village lies in the center of a small valley centered on a small brook that runs through the village. One hill of the valley is covered by a sunflower field. Over the other is the further section of the village, with the village vineyards.

History
In the 9th century, the territory of Modrany became part of the Kingdom of Hungary. In historical records the village was first mentioned in 1205. After the Austro-Hungarian army disintegrated in November 1918, Czechoslovak troops occupied the area, later acknowledged internationally by the Treaty of Trianon. Between 1938 and 1945 Modrany once more  became part of Miklós Horthy's Hungary through the First Vienna Award. From 1945 until the Velvet Divorce, it was part of Czechoslovakia. Since then it has been part of Slovakia.

The Soviet Army had a base located on the outskirts of town, which they abandoned around 1989. A hill near the village was used for target practice for tanks. The base has since been broken apart and sold for scrap, though some ruins remain.

Ethnicity
The village is about 86% Hungarian, 9% Slovak and 5% Romany.

Facilities
The village has a public library, and a football pitch. There are also two churches, Catholic and Calvinist and a new town hall. There is a pre-school and primary school (K-9). High school students attend a split Hungarian/Slovakian school in Komárno.  Buses run from the village to Komárno frequently.

Partner towns
  Ákosfalva
  Isztimér
  Kocs
  Sükösd
Source: Obec Modrany - Družobné obce

References

External links
 

Villages and municipalities in the Komárno District
Hungarian communities in Slovakia